Urrúnaga (in Basque and officially Urrunaga) is a council of Villarreal de Álava, in the province of Álava, Basque Country (Spain).

The following localities belong to this council:

 Urrúnaga (in basque and officially Urrunaga).
 Navarrete (in basque and officially Nafarrate).

Demography 

The current population of Urrúnaga is 108 inhabitants.

References 

Populated places in Álava